Football Club Krasava was a Russian football team. It was formally licensed as based in Odintsovo, but actually played the home games in Moscow. It was founded in 2021 by Yevgeny Savin, a former player and commentator whose popular YouTube channel is called "Krasava". It was licensed for the third-tier Russian FNL 2 for the 2021–22 season. It did not receive the license for the 2022–23 season.

References

Association football clubs established in 2021
Association football clubs disestablished in 2022
Defunct football clubs in Russia
Defunct football clubs in Moscow
2021 establishments in Russia
2022 disestablishments in Russia